Mishka NYC is a streetwear company and record label currently headquartered in Los Angeles, California. It was established in 2003 by Mikhail Bortnik and Greg Rivera in Brooklyn, New York.  Featuring bright colors and grotesque but playful cartoon imagery, the brand designs T-shirts, hats, sweaters, and accessories.  Mishka NYC's most notable design is the "Keep Watch" eyeball and the "Bearmop" logo, a cartoon bear.

References

External links
 
 

Clothing companies of the United States
Companies based in New York City
American record labels